John Minchin Lloyd (1835 — December 18, 1892) was a bricklayer and police officer in Washington, D.C., in the United States. He was one of the first police officers hired by the Metropolitan Police Department of the District of Columbia when its Day Watch was first formed in 1855. He played a role in the trial of the conspirators in the Abraham Lincoln assassination. Arrested but never charged in the conspiracy, Lloyd's testimony was critical in convicting Mary Surratt.

Early life and career
John Minchin Lloyd's date of birth is not clear, but two sources have him born in 1835 in southern Maryland in the United States to William Lloyd. He was the oldest of two sons. By 1850, 14-year-old John and his father had moved into Washington, D.C. He probably had little schooling, and instead apprenticed as a bricklayer. By 1855, John Lloyd was working full-time as a bricklayer, and living at 506 8th Street NW.

The City of Washington had organized a night constabulary in October 1804, but after members of the Whig Party rioted in the city in 1842 and nearly assaulted President John Tyler, a new police force was organized. In March 1851, the police force was reorganized into a day watch, night watch, and auxiliary. John M. Lloyd was appointed one of new police officers, at a yearly salary of $480 ($ in  dollars). It is not clear when Lloyd joined the force or what duties he was assigned, for he does not appear in the list of officers assigned to wards in 1851. But in 1855, records show that Lloyd was assigned to the 7th Police District, and his pay was raised to $576 a year ($ in  dollars). His pay rose to $630 a year ($ in  dollars) in 1858.

The District of Columbia's Metropolitan Police Department was organized by Congress in August 1861, replacing the police forces of the City of Washington, Georgetown, and the District of Columbia (that portion of the District outside the City of Washington's city limits). For reasons that are not clear, Lloyd left the Metropolitan Police Department in 1862. His profession upon leaving the police force is also unknown. It is well understood, however, that Lloyd was openly sympathetic to the cause of the Confederate States of America. The American Civil War broke out in April 1861, and in 1862 Lloyd may have left the force due to his political views.

Involvement in the Lincoln assassination

Leasing the Surratt tavern
Lloyd moved out of the District of Columbia after resigning from the police force, and into Prince George's County. He later told Mary Surratt that he spent time running a tavern there. In December 1864, Lloyd moved to the bustling village of Surrattsville. In the fall of 1864, she began considering moving to her townhouse in the city. Surratt leased her tavern to Lloyd on December 1 for $500 a year, and moved into town the same day.

Mrs. Surratt lived in her townhouse with her daughter, Anna, and son, John. Over the next five months, she rented rooms to a number of people, including Louis J. Weichmann; John Surratt; George Atzerodt, and Lewis Powell. These last three men, David Herold and John Wilkes Booth subsequently conspired to kidnap President Abraham Lincoln in March 1865. When that plot failed, they decided to assassinate the president instead. Lincoln was fatally shot at Ford's Theatre on the evening of April 14, 1865.

Meetings with the conspirators
As part of the plot to kidnap Lincoln in March 1865, John Surratt, Atzerodt, and conspirator David Herold hid two Spencer carbines, ammunition, and some other supplies at the Surratt tavern in Surrattsville. On April 11, Mary Surratt rented a carriage and drove to the Surrattsville tavern to collect (she later said) a debt owed her by a former neighbor. But according to Lloyd, Surratt told him to get the "shooting irons" ready to be picked up. Worried that the inn might be searched by federal troops, Lloyd was concerned about the weapons left in his possession.  Later that day, he asked George Atzerodt what to do with them, and was told to bury them.

On April 14, Surratt once again visited the family tavern in Surrattsville on April 14 (the day of the assassination) to collect a debt. Shortly before she left the city, Booth visited the Surratt boarding house and spoke privately with Mrs. Surratt. He gave her a package (later found to contain binoculars) to give to Lloyd. Surratt delivered the package, and (according to Lloyd) again told Lloyd to have the "shooting irons" ready for pick-up and handed him a wrapped package from Booth. (Booth and Herold picked up the rifles and binoculars that evening as they fled Washington after Lincoln's assassination.) Lloyd repaired a broken spring on Mrs. Surratt's wagon before she left.

Arrest and confession
Federal investigators immediately identified Booth and his co-conspirators, and believed they had headed south into Maryland and then Virginia in an attempt to escape. Nodley Anderson, an innkeeper in the hamlet of Piscataway, Maryland, notified them that the Surratt tavern in Surrattsville was a notorious meeting place for Confederate spies, and that Lloyd may know something about the assassination. When questioned, Lloyd initially denied knowing Booth or Herold, and had seen neither man the night of the assassination. He was questioned a second time by D.C. police, and repeated his claims.  After the police left, he fled the tavern and went to the home of his wife's relatives in the hamlet of Allens Fresh, Charles County, Maryland. But local Surrattsville residents told investigators that Lloyd did indeed know Booth and some of the other conspirators, and with Mrs. Surratt having been arrested on April 17, federal troops finally went in pursuit of Lloyd. Lloyd had already decided to return to Surrattsville to avoid suspicion, and was arrested on the road there on April 18, 1865.

John Lloyd was interrogated at a makeshift headquarters in Robey's post office in Surrattsville on April 18, 19, and 20. His interrogators included Captain George Cottingham, U.S. Army, several other U.S. Army officers, and several D.C police detectives. Whether Lloyd was tortured in order to obtain his testimony is highly contested by published sources. Several sources claim Lloyd was an alcoholic, and was denied liquor in order to take advantage of his illness and make him talk. Some sources claim Lloyd was hung by his thumbs until he agreed to testify against Mrs. Surratt. Higdon says Lloyd was merely threatened with hanging by his thumbs, but not tortured. But most sources claim that Lloyd was merely intensively interrogated without the use of torture or deprivation of alcohol. Larson argues that the interrogation merely consisted of "several days of back-and-forth questioning, stalling, intimidation, and obfuscation, manipulating Lloyd and wearing him down in the hopes of extracting a confession." Cottingham revealed that Secretary of War Edwin M. Stanton had called for the death penalty for the conspirators. Cottingham played off Lloyd's fears that his family might also be arrested or tried, and that the military would seek to put him to death unless he confessed. Lloyd told Cottingham that he feared being murdered by the other conspirators, but by April 22 Cottingham had wrung a full confession from Lloyd.

Lloyd informed his interrogators that John Surratt, Atzerodt, and Herold had hidden a pair of carbines, ammunition, some rope, and a wrench in a wall on the second floor.  He admitted that Mrs. Surratt had reminded him of their existence on April 11 and April 14. He also revealed that Booth and Herold had visited the tavern near midnight on April 14, taking one of the guns as well as the field glasses and some whiskey. Booth, Lloyd said, bragged that he had killed Lincoln. Lloyd helped the investigators recover the second gun, which confirmed his testimony. Seeing his wife at the tavern, Lloyd cried, "Oh, Mrs. Surratt, that vile woman, she has ruined me! I am to be shot!"

Lloyd was transferred to the Union Army's headquarters at Bryantown, Maryland, where he was further interrogated by Colonel Henry H. Wells. He revealed more details of the conspiracy, and of Booth and Herold's visit on April 14. Portions of his testimony tended to implicate John and Mary Surratt, George Atzertodt, and David Herold in the assassination plot.

Lloyd was transferred to the Old Capitol Prison in Washington D.C., on April 23. He was questioned further there.

Assassination trial testimony
Although John Lloyd was imprisoned for some weeks, he was never charged with any crimes and was eventually released. The reason was his testimony: The law at the time did not permit prosecutors to try a witness for conspiracy if he testified against his co-conspirators. Secretary of War Stanton and military prosecutors understood that Lloyd would go free, but they would win the conviction of Surratt and the others in the process.

The prosecution presented nine witnesses against Mrs. Surratt, but most of their case rested on the testimony of just two men—John Lloyd and Surratt boarding house tenant Louis Weichmann.

Lloyd testified on May 13 and 15, 1865, regarding the hiding of the carbines and other supplies at the tavern in March, and the two conversations he had with Mrs. Surratt in which she told him to get the "shooting irons" ready. The defense called Captain Cottingham, and unintentionally damaged its case. Cottingham testified that Lloyd feared that the conspirators would kill him. When asked who Cottingham believed the conspirators to be, he mentioned Lloyd's outburst about "Mrs. Surratt, that vile woman" and said he had concluded that Lloyd meant Mrs. Surratt was one of the conspirators. Lloyd's testimony had been the most important for the prosecution's case, for it indicated Mary Surratt played an active role in the conspiracy in the days just before Lincoln's death.

The defense strategy was to impeach Lloyd's testimony. Several witnesses impugned Lloyd's character by testifying about his alcoholism. Several eyewitnesses said he appeared completely intoxicated on the day of Lincoln's death (April 14), implying that he could not have remembered with clarity what happened that day. Surratt's chief attorney, Reverdy Johnson, asserted repeatedly that Lloyd was an unreliable witness, and that the evidence against Mary Surratt was entirely circumstantial. The only evidence linking Surratt to the conspiracy to kill Lincoln, he said, came from Lloyd and Weichmann, and neither man was telling the truth (he said). Lloyd's testimony was coerced, he claimed. The government's case was hindered by its failure to call as a witness the man who shared Lloyd's carriage when he talked with Mrs. Surratt (an individual who could have verified Lloyd's version of the "shooting irons" story).

The nine-member military tribunal hearing the case sentenced Mary Surratt, George Atzerodt, David Herold, and Lewis Powell to death on July 5, 1865. As their crimes had occurred in an area under military jurisdiction, the Habeas Corpus Suspension Act denied them any appeal. The four were hanged at the Washington Arsenal on July 7, 1865.

Death and descendants

In October 1865, Lloyd moved back to the District of Columbia from Surrattsville.

For the rest of his life, Lloyd worked as a bricklayer and construction contractor in Washington, D.C. He was severely injured in early December 1892 when, while helping to construct a building, the scaffold he was standing on collapsed. He died on December 18. A Roman Catholic, Lloyd was buried in Mount Olivet Cemetery.

Personal life
The 21-year-old John married 20-year-old Mary Elizabeth Mahorney (sometimes spelled Mahoney) of Virginia in 1857. They had several children, but all died of smallpox at a young age and none survived him.

See also
The Conspirator

References

Citations

Bibliography

External links

Year of birth uncertain
Date of birth unknown
1830s births

1892 deaths
Burials at Mount Olivet Cemetery (Washington, D.C.)
Metropolitan Police Department of the District of Columbia officers
Accidental deaths from falls
Accidental deaths in Washington, D.C.
People associated with the assassination of Abraham Lincoln
People from Prince George's County, Maryland
People of Washington, D.C., in the American Civil War